Achlys triphylla, common names sweet after death, deer-foot or vanilla-leaf, is a plant species native to the mountains of the West Coast of North America. It has been reported from the Cascades and from the Coast Ranges in British Columbia, Washington, Oregon and northern California, at elevations of up to 1500 m (5000 feet).

Achlys triphylla is an herb up to 40 cm (16 inches) tall. It has trifoliate leaves and small white flowers.

Medicinal uses
Multiple Pacific Northwest tribes use the leaves in an infusion drink for tuberculosis. One Lummi informant said the whole plant was mashed and soaked in water, which was drunk as an emetic.

References

External links

  Jepson eFlora (TJM2) treatment of Achlys triphylla subsp. triphylla

Berberidaceae
Flora of British Columbia
Flora of California
Flora of Oregon
Flora of Washington (state)
Flora of the Klamath Mountains
Plants described in 1821
Taxa named by Augustin Pyramus de Candolle